Craig Douglas Wescoe is an American Magic: The Gathering player. He won Pro Tour Dragon's Maze in 2013. He has two additional Pro Tour top 8 finishes to his name, and is well known as a champion of the "White Weenie" strategy, having played an aggressive white deck at all the Pro Tours where he made the top 8.

Achievements

References 

Living people
American Magic: The Gathering players
Year of birth missing (living people)